Janice Lee may refer to:
 Janice Y. K. Lee, American author
 Lee Ying Ha, Malaysian politician

See also
 Janice Romary (full name Janice-Lee York Romary), American foil fencer
 Janis Lee (born 1945), Kansas state senator